The list of shipwrecks in 1928 includes ships sunk, foundered, grounded, or otherwise lost during 1928.

January

1 January

2 January

5 January

6 January

7 January

9 January

10 January

11 January

12 January

13 January

14 January

15 January

17 January

18 January

21 January

24 January

25 January

27 January

28 January

30 January

31 January

February

1 February

3 February

7 February

9 February

11 February

13 February

14 February

15 February

16 February

17 February

18 February

19 February

20 February

21 February

23 February

24 February

25 February

26 February

29 February

Unknown date

March

2 March

4 March

5 March

7 March

9 March

12 March

13 March

14 March

16 March

17 March

19 March

20 March

21 March

22 March

23 March

24 March

25 March

26 March

27 March

28 March

29 March

31 March

April

1 April

2 April

4 April

5 April

9 April

10 April

12 April

16 April

17 April

21 April

22 April

23 April

24 April

25 April

26 April

28 April

30 April

May

2 May

3 May

4 May

7 May

9 May

10 May

15 May

17 May

18 May

19 May

21 May

23 May

24 May

29 May

30 May

Unknown date

June

1 June

4 June

5 June

6 June

8 June

9 June

12 June

14 June

15 June

17 June

18 June

20 June

21 June

22 June

23 June

29 June

July

1 July

2 July

6 July

7 July

10 July

11 July

12 July

13 July

14 July

17 July

19 July

20 July

21 July

24 July

26 July

27 July

28 July

29 July

31 July

August

2 August

3 August

4 August

6 August

7 August

8 August

9 August

10 August

11 August

12 August

13 August

15 August

16 August

19 August

20 August

22 August

23 August

24 August

25 August

27 August

28 August

29 August

31 August

September

1 September

5 September

6 September

7 September

8 September

10 September

12 September

13 September

14 September

15 September

17 September

18 September

19 September

20 September

21 September

22 September

23 September

25 September

26 September

27 September

28 September

29 September

30 September

Unknown date

October

1 October

3 October

4 October

5 October

6 October

8 October

9 October

10 October

14 October

15 October

16 October

17 October

18 October

19 October

20 October

21 October

22 October

24 October

27 October

31 October

November

1 November

2 November

3 November

4 November

5 November

6 November

7 November

10 November

12 November

15 November

16 November

17 November

18 November

19 November

21 November

22 November

23 November

24 November

25 November

26 November

27 November

28 November

30 November

Unknown date

December

1 December

2 December

4 December

5 December

7 December

8 December

10 December

11 December

12 December

13 December

14 December

15 December

16 December

17 December

18 December

20 December

21 December

22 December

23 December

24 December

25 December

27 December

28 December

29 December

30 December

31 December

Unknown date

References 

1928
 
Ships